Fabiana dos Santos Moraes (born 5 June 1986, in São Paulo) is Brazilian athlete specialising in the sprint hurdles. She holds 10 National titles and 3 South American Titles.

She represented Brazil at the Rio 2007 Pan American Games, Toronto 2015 Pan American Games, 2015 World Championships, Portland 2016 World Indoor Championships, Rio 2016 Olympic Games, and 2017 World Championships.

Her personal bests are 12.84 seconds in 100 metres hurdles (+ 0.8  m/s, Ávila 2017) and 8.08 seconds in the 60 metres hurdles (São Caetano do Sul 2016).

Competition record

References

External links 
 
 

1986 births
Living people
Athletes from São Paulo
Brazilian female hurdlers
Pan American Games athletes for Brazil
Athletes (track and field) at the 2007 Pan American Games
Athletes (track and field) at the 2015 Pan American Games
World Athletics Championships athletes for Brazil
Athletes (track and field) at the 2016 Summer Olympics
Olympic athletes of Brazil
Athletes (track and field) at the 2018 South American Games
South American Games silver medalists for Brazil
South American Games medalists in athletics
21st-century Brazilian women
20th-century Brazilian women